Pont-Sainte-Maxence is a railway station serving the town Pont-Sainte-Maxence, Oise department, northern France. It is situated on the Creil–Jeumont railway.

Services

The station is served by regional trains to Creil, Compiègne and Paris.

References

Railway stations in Oise
Railway stations in France opened in 1847